Psalydolytta fusca is a species of blister beetle. It is a pest of millets in Africa.

References

Meloidae
Insect pests of millets